West German Industry and the Challenge of the Nazi Past is a book by American historian S. Jonathan Wiesen, published by University of North Carolina Press in 2001. It focuses on how West German industrialists whitewashed their participation in Nazi crimes during the ten years after the war.

References

University of North Carolina Press books
2001 non-fiction books
Books about companies